The Upper Cumberland Business Journal is a daily online and quarterly print magazine in Cookeville, Tennessee.

External links
 Official website

Newspapers published in Tennessee
Business and management journals